The 2016 Metro Atlantic Athletic Conference women's basketball tournament was held March 3–7 at the Times Union Center in Albany, New York. Iona defeated Quinnipiac to win their first MAAC Tournament to earn their first automatic trip to the NCAA women's basketball tournament in school history.

Seeds
Teams are seeded by conference record, with a ties broken by record between the tied teams followed by record against the regular-season champion, if necessary.

Schedule

Bracket and Results

All times listed are Eastern

See also
 Metro Atlantic Athletic Conference
 MAAC women's basketball tournament
 2016 MAAC men's basketball tournament

External links
 2016 MAAC Women's Basketball Championship

References

MAAC women's basketball tournament
2015–16 Metro Atlantic Athletic Conference women's basketball season
Basketball competitions in Albany, New York
MAAC women's basketball tournament
MAAC women's basketball tournament
Women's sports in New York (state)
College basketball tournaments in New York (state)